Elizabeth Yates may refer to:

Elizabeth Yates (actress) (1799–1860), English actress
Elizabeth Yates (author) (1905–2001), United States author
Elizabeth Yates (mayor) (1845–1918), first female mayor of the British Empire, in Onehunga, New Zealand
Elizabeth Upham Yates (1857–1942), American suffragist and missionary in China

See also
Elizabeth Yeats (1868–1940), daughter of J.B. Yeats